Princess Alexandra of Hanover (Alexandra Charlotte Ulrike Maryam Virginia; born 20 July 1999) is the fourth child of Princess Caroline of Monaco and the third of Ernst August, Prince of Hanover.

Early life and family 
Alexandra was born on 20 July 1999 in Vöcklabruck, Upper Austria. She was christened on 19 September 1999 by Horst Hirschler, Landesbischof of the Evangelical-Lutheran Church of Hanover, in a ceremony at her father's hunting lodge Auerbach, near Grünau im Almtal, Upper Austria. Her godparents are her paternal aunt Alexandra, Princess of Leiningen, maternal half-sister Charlotte Casiraghi, Ulrike Ulmschneider, Maryam Sachs, Virginia Gallico, George Condo, and Eric Maier. She was named after each of her godmothers.

She has half-siblings from her parents' previous marriages. From her father's previous marriage, she has two half-brothers, Hereditary Prince Ernst August and Prince Christian of Hanover. From her mother's previous marriage, she has two half-brothers, Andrea and Pierre Casiraghi, and one half-sister, Charlotte Casiraghi. Her maternal uncle, Albert II, is the sovereign of Monaco. She is a granddaughter of American actress Grace Kelly. On her father's side, she is a descendant of Queen Victoria of the United Kingdom, Wilhelm II, German Emperor, and King Christian IX of Denmark.

Alexandra is the only one of Princess Caroline's four children who bears any royal style or title. While she is formally styled as Her Royal Highness Princess Alexandra of Hanover in Monaco, she is afforded the style and title out of courtesy elsewhere. As the Kingdom of Hanover no longer exists, her legally recognized name in Germany is Alexandra Princess of Hanover, with Princess of Hanover forming her surname. She is 13th in the line of succession to the Monegasque throne. Through her father, she was in the line of succession to the British throne until 2018, when she was confirmed into the Catholic Church.

Figure skating career 
Alexandra began skating when she was ten years old after receiving ice skates as a Christmas present. When she was 11 years old, she competed at a competition in Toulon, France. At the age of 12, she competed in the "Skate 7" class at the 10th Figure Skating Championship in Monaco, finishing in second place. She was awarded the cup of the Monegasque Federation of Skating.

Alexandra represented Monaco in figure skating at the 2015 European Youth Olympic Festival in Austria and in two competitive events during the 2015–16 season at the ISU Junior Grand Prix of Figure Skating.

Career results
JGP: Junior Grand Prix

Programs

Competitive highlights

Detailed results

Personal life 
When Alexandra was 11 years old, German entertainment magazine Freizeit Revue published an article about and photographs of her competing at a figure skating competition in France. The article also covered her mother's dating life and other personal matters. Alexandra sought injunctive relief and sued the magazine, taking the case to the German Federal Court of Justice.

In March 2015, Alexandra attended Monaco's Rose Ball for the first time. However, it was not until the next year's ball that she entered the event with her family, thus gaining the notice of the society press.

In October 2018, Princess Alexandra converted to Catholicism, thereby renouncing her distant place in the line of succession to the British throne.

References

1999 births
Converts to Roman Catholicism from Lutheranism
Living people
People from Vöcklabruck
House of Grimaldi
House of Hanover
German expatriates in Monaco
German people of American descent
German people of Italian descent
German people of Irish descent
German Roman Catholics
Kelly family
Hanoverian princesses
German people of Monegasque descent
German people of Scottish descent
German people of English descent
German people of Mexican descent
German people of Danish descent
Monegasque figure skaters